Roy Ayers (born September 10, 1940) is an American funk, soul, and jazz composer, vibraphone player, and music producer. Ayers began his career as a post-bop jazz artist, releasing several albums with Atlantic Records, before his tenure at Polydor Records beginning in the 1970s, during which he helped pioneer jazz-funk. He is a key figure in the acid jazz movement, and has been dubbed "The Godfather of Neo Soul". He is best known for his compositions "Everybody Loves the Sunshine", "Searchin", and "Running Away". At one time, he was said to have more sampled hits by rappers than any other artist.

Biography

Early life
Ayers was born on September 10, 1940, in Los Angeles. He grew up in a musical family, where his father played trombone and his mother played piano. At the age of five, he was given his first pair of vibraphone mallets by Lionel Hampton. The area of Los Angeles that Ayers grew up in, South Park (later known as South Central) was at the center of the Southern California Black music scene. The schools he attended (Wadsworth Elementary, Nevins Middle School, and Thomas Jefferson High School) were all close to the famed Central Avenue, Los Angeles' equivalent of Harlem's Lenox Avenue and Chicago's State Street. Roy would likely have been exposed to music as it not only emanated from the many nightclubs and bars in the area, but also poured out of many of the homes where the musicians who kept the scene alive lived in and around Central. During high school, Ayers sang in the church choir and fronted a band named The Latin Lyrics, in which he played steel guitar and piano. His high school, Thomas Jefferson High School, produced various talented musicians, such as Dexter Gordon. Ayers has 3 known children Roy Ayers Jr, Nabil Ayers and Lauren Faith (Musician).

Career
Ayers started recording as a bebop sideman in 1962 and rose to prominence when he dropped out of City College and joined jazz flautist Herbie Mann in 1966.

In the early 1970s, Roy Ayers started his own band called Roy Ayers Ubiquity, a name he chose because ubiquity means a state of being everywhere at the same time.

Ayers was responsible for the highly regarded soundtrack to Jack Hill's 1973 blaxploitation film Coffy, which starred Pam Grier. He later moved from a jazz-funk sound to R&B, as seen on Mystic Voyage, which featured the songs "Evolution" and the underground disco hit "Brother Green (The Disco King)", as well as the title track from his 1976 album Everybody Loves the Sunshine.
 
In 1977, Ayers produced an album by the group RAMP, Come into Knowledge. That fall, he had his biggest hit with "Running Away".

In late 1979, Ayers scored his only top ten single on Billboard's Hot Disco/Dance chart with "Don't Stop The Feeling", which was also the leadoff single from his 1980 album No Stranger to Love, whose title track was sampled in Jill Scott's 2001 song "Watching Me" from her debut album Who Is Jill Scott?

In the late 1970s, Ayers toured in Nigeria for six weeks with Afrobeat pioneer Fela Kuti, one of the African continent's most recognizable musicians. In 1980, Phonodisk released Music of Many Colors in Nigeria, featuring one side led by Ayers' group and the other led by Africa '70.

In 1981, Ayers produced an album with the singer Sylvia Striplin, Give Me Your Love (Uno Melodic Records, 1981).  That same year, he also produced a second album called Africa, Center of the World on Polydor records along with James Bedford and Ayers's bass player William Henry Allen. Allen can be heard talking to his daughter on the track "Intro/The River Niger". The album was recorded at the Sigma Sound Studios, New York.

Ayers performed a solo on John "Jellybean" Benitez's production of Whitney Houston's "Love Will Save The Day" from her second multi-Platinum studio album Whitney. The single was released in July 1988 by Arista Records.

Ayers has played his live act for millions of people across the globe, including Japan, Australia, England and other parts of Europe.

Ayers is known for helping to popularize feel good music in the 1970s, stating that "I like that happy feeling all of the time, so that ingredient is still there. I try to generate that because it's the natural way I am". The types of music that he used to do this consisted of funk, salsa, jazz, rock, soul and rap.

1990s to present

In 1992, Ayers released two albums, Drive and Wake Up, for the hip-hop label Ichiban Records. and also collaborated with Rick James for an album and is quoted to have been a very close friend of his.

In 1993, Ayers appeared on the record Guru's Jazzmatazz Vol. 1, playing vibraphone on the song "Take a Look (At Yourself)". The following year he appeared on the Red Hot Organization's compilation album Stolen Moments: Red Hot + Cool. The album, meant to raise awareness and funds in support of the AIDS epidemic in relation to the African-American community, was heralded as "Album of the Year" by Time Magazine.

During the 2000s and 2010s, Ayers ventured into house music, collaborating with such stalwarts of the genre as Masters at Work and Kerri Chandler.

Ayers started two record labels, Uno Melodic and Gold Mink Records. The first released several LPs, including Sylvia Striplin's, while the second folded after a few singles.

In 2004, Ayers put out a collection of unreleased recordings called Virgin Ubiquity: Unreleased recordings 1976–1981 which allowed fans to hear cuts that didn't make it onto the classic Polydor albums from his more popular years.

He has also worked in collaborations with soul songstress Erykah Badu and other artists on his 2004 album Mahogany Vibes.

Roy Ayers hosts the fictitious radio station "Fusion FM" in Grand Theft Auto IV (2008).

In 2015, he appeared on Tyler, The Creator's album Cherry Bomb on the track "Find Your Wings".

Awards and influence

A documentary, The Roy Ayers Project, featuring Ayers and a number artists who have sampled his music and have been influenced by him and his music, has been in development for a number of years. The Roy Ayers Project has been rebranded as "Roy Ayers Connection", which highlights Roy Ayers and all the people and things that he is connected to.

Pharrell Williams cites Roy Ayers as one of his key musical heroes.

Ayers is a recipient of the Congress of Racial Equality Lifetime Achievement Award.

Discography

As leader
 West Coast Vibes (United Artists, 1963)
 Virgo Vibes (Atlantic, 1967)
 Stoned Soul Picnic (Atlantic, 1968)
 Daddy Bug (Atlantic, 1969)
 All Blues (Columbia, 1969)
 Unchain My Heart (Columbia, 1970)
 Ubiquity (Polydor, 1970)
 Live at the Montreux Jazz Festival (Polydor, 1972)
 He's Coming (Polydor, 1972)
 Virgo Red (Polydor, 1973)
 Red Black & Green (Polydor, 1973)
 Coffy (1973)
 Change Up the Groove (Polydor, 1974)
 Mystic Voyage (Polydor, 1975)
 A Tear to a Smile (Polydor, 1975)
 Daddy Bug & Friends (Atlantic, 1976)
 Everybody Loves the Sunshine (Polydor, 1976)
 Vibrations  (Polydor, 1976)
 Lifeline (Polydor, 1977)
 You Send Me (Polydor, 1978)
 Step in to Our Life (Polydor, 1978)
 Starbooty (Elektra, 1978)
 Let's Do It (Polydo, 1978)
 Fever (Polydor, 1979)
 No Stranger to Love (Polydor, 1979)
 Love Fantasy (Polydor, 1980)
 Africa, Center of the World (Polydor, 1981)
 Feeling Good (Polydor, 1982)
 Lots of Love (Uno Melodic, 1983)
 In the Dark (Columbia, 1984)
 You Might Be Surprised (Columbia, 1985)
 I'm the One (Columbia, 1987)
 Drive (Ichiban, 1988)
 Wake Up (Ichiban, 1989)
 Searchin'  (Jazz House, 1991)
 Hot (Jazz House, 1992)
 Good Vibrations (Jazz House, 1993)
 The Essential Groove Live (Jazz House, 1994)
 Mahogany Vibe (Rapster, 2004)

As sideman
With Curtis Amy
 Way Down  (Pacific Jazz, 1962)
 Tippin' on Through (Pacific Jazz, 1962)
 Katanga! (Pacific Jazz, 1998)

With Herbie Mann
 A Mann & a Woman (Atlantic, 1966)
 The Wailing Dervishes (Atlantic, 1967)
 The Beat Goes On (Atlantic, 1967)
 Impressions of the Middle East (Atlantic, 1967)
 Glory of Love (A&M, 1967)
 Windows Opened (Atlantic, 1968)
 Concerto Grosso in D Blues (Atlantic, 1969)
 Live at the Whisky a Go Go (Atlantic, 1969)
 Memphis Underground (Atlantic, 1969)
 Stone Flute (Embryo, 1970)
 Muscle Shoals Nitty Gritty (Embryo, 1970)
 Memphis Two-Step (Embryo, 1971)
 The Evolution of Mann (Atlantic, 1972)
 Sunbelt (Atlantic, 1978)
 Deep Pocket (Kokopelli, 1992)

With Jack Wilson 
 The Jack Wilson Quartet (Atlantic, 1963)
 Plays Brazilian Mancini (Vault, 1965)
 Ramblin'  (Vault, 1966)
 Something Personal (Blue Note, 1967)
 Call Me: Jazz from the Penthouse (Century, 2018)

With others
 4Hero, Creating Patterns (Talkin' Loud, 2001)
 Amerie, Touch (Columbia/Sony, 2005)
 Erykah Badu, Mama's Gun (Motown, 2000)
 Christophe Beck, Ant-Man (Hollywood, 2015)
 Eric Benet, A Day in the Life (Warner Bros., 1999)
 Mary J. Blige, Share My World (MCA, 1997)
 Zachary Breaux, Groovin (NYC 1992)
 Brooklyn Funk Essentials, Stay Good (Dorado, 2019)
 Jean Carn, Trust Me (Motown, 1982)
 Coolio, It Takes a Thief (Tommy Boy 1994)
 Cookie Crew, Fade to Black (1991)
 Digable Planets, Blowout (EMI, 1994)
 Doldinger, Doldinger in New York (WEA, 1994)
 Will Downing, After Tonight (Peak, 2007)
 Ronnie Foster, Love Satellite (CBS, 1978)
 Funkdoobiest, Brothas Doobie (Music On Vinyl, 2016)
 Stu Gardner, Music from the Bill Cosby Show Vol II (Columbia, 1987)
 Ghostface Killah, Apollo Kids (Def Jam, 2010)
 Wolfgang Haffner, Urban Life (Skip, 2001)
 Whitney Houston, Whitney (Arista, 1987)
 Rick James, Throwin' Down (Gordy, 1982)
 Mark James, Mark James (Bell, 1973)
 Miles Jaye, Miles (Island, 1987)
 Miles Jaye, Let's Start Over (4th & Broadway, 1987)
 Jazz Crusaders, Happy Again (Sin-Drome, 1995)
 Jazz Crusaders, Soul Axess (True Life, 2004)
 DJ Jazzy Jeff & The Fresh Prince, Code Red (Jive, 1993)
 Jellybean, Spillin' the Beans (Atlantic, 1991)
 Jeru the Damaja, The Sun Rises in the East (Payday, 1994)
 Ronny Jordan, A Brighter Day (Blue Note, 2000)
 Alicia Keys, Here (RCA, 2016)
 Fela Kuti & Roy Ayers, Music of Many Colours (Phonodisk, 1980)
 Talib Kweli, Eardrum (Warner Bros., 2007)
 Gerald Levert, The G Spot (Elektra, 2002)
 David Linx, Hungry Voices (Miracle, 1989)
 Marley Marl, Re-Entry (BBE 2001)
 James Moody, Moody's Party Live at the Blue Note (Telarc, 1995)
 Mos Def, Black On Both Sides (Rawkus1999)
 Najee, Embrace (N-Coded, 2003)
 David "Fathead" Newman, Lonely Avenue (Atlantic, 1972)
 David "Fathead" Newman, Newmanism (Atlantic, 1974)
 Vi Redd, Birdcall (United Artists, 1962)
 Pete Rock & C.L. Smooth, The Main Ingredient (Traffic 2011)
 Jill Scott, Who Is Jill Scott? (Hidden Beach 2000)
 Sandra St. Victor, Gemini: Both Sides (Expansion, 2001)
 Joseph Tawadros, Chameleons of the White Shadow (ABC Music 2013)
 James Taylor Quartet, Room at the Top (Sanctuary, 2002)
 Tony Touch, The Piece Maker 2 (Koch, 2004)
 A Tribe Called Quest, People's Instinctive Travels and the Paths of Rhythm (Sony, 2015)
 Tyler, the Creator, Cherry Bomb (Odd Future, 2015)
 Leroy Vinnegar, Leroy Walks Again!! (Contemporary, 1963)
 Buster Williams, Crystal Reflections (Muse, 1976)
 Vanessa Williams, The Sweetest Days (Mercury,  1994)
 Gerald Wilson, On Stage (Pacific Jazz, 1965)
 Gerald Wilson, The Golden Sword (Pacific Jazz, 1966)
 Jody Watley, I Love to Love (MAW, 2000)
 Jody Watley, Midnight Lounge (Shanachie, 2003)

References

External links

 Documentary Film of Roy Ayers
 [ Allmusic Guide to Roy Ayers]
 Discography at Discogs
 Discography at Rate Your Music

1940 births
Living people
African-American male singer-songwriters
American dance musicians
American jazz vibraphonists
American funk singers
American rhythm and blues singers
Musicians from Los Angeles
Muse Records artists
Soul-jazz musicians
Polydor Records artists
Ichiban Records artists
Verve Records artists
Atlantic Records artists
Singer-songwriters from California
Fela Kuti
20th-century African-American male singers
21st-century African-American male singers
Jazz vibraphonists
Barely Breaking Even artists